Hold On is the seventeenth studio album by American country folk group Nitty Gritty Dirt Band, released on July 7, 1987. The album produced three singles "Baby's Got a Hold on Me", "Fishin' in the Dark", and "Oh What a Love". This was the last Dirt Band album to feature John McEuen as a member until 2002's Will the Circle Be Unbroken, Volume III.

Track listing

Personnel

Jimmie Fadden – drums, harmonica, jaw harp, background vocals
Jeff Hanna – vocals, guitars
Jimmy Ibbotson – vocals, electric bass, guitars, mandolin
Bob Carpenter – vocals, keyboards, accordion on "Angelyne"
John McEuen – mandolin on "Tennessee", acoustic guitar on "Oh What A Love" and "Dancing to the Beat of a Broken Heart"

Additional studio musicians are heard on this recording, but are not credited on the album notes, including a dobro.

Production

Producer – Josh Leo
 * Producer – Marshall Morgan & Paul Worley for Morley Productions

Chart performance

References

1987 albums
Nitty Gritty Dirt Band albums
Warner Records albums